Caught in a Life is Norwegian band Donkeyboy's debut album from October 2009. It was produced by Simen M Eriksrud and Espen Berg at Livingroom Studios, Oslo. It topped the Norwegian Albums Chart in the winter of 2009.

It was released on 19 October 2009. The album has produced for the band two massive #1 hit singles on the Norwegian Singles Chart, "Ambitions" that stayed on top of the Norwegian charts for 13 weeks, followed by "Sometimes" that stayed on the top of the same charts for another 8 weeks, both in 2009. "Ambitions" also topped the Swedish Singles Chart in February 2010.

There were three more singles from the album that reached the Top 10, namely "Broke My Eyes" that reached #6, "Awake" that reached #8 and "Blade Running" that also reached #8.

In early 2010, "Stereolife" has been released as a single.

Track listing

References

Donkeyboy albums
2009 debut albums
European Border Breakers Award-winning albums